Nicol Delago (born 5 January 1996) is an Italian World Cup alpine ski racer, and specializes in the speed events. She represented Italy at two Winter Olympics, and made her first World Cup podium in Italy 

She is the sister of Nadia Delago.

Biography
Born in Brixen in South Tyrol, Delago won two bronze medals in downhill at the World Junior Championships, in 2015 

Four Alpine skiers from the Delago family have participated in World Cup and World Championships competitions. Siblings Oskar (born 1963) and Karla Delago (b.1965), specialists in speed events in the 1980s and their two nieces, Nicol and Nadia (b.1997), active in the 2010s.

World Cup results

Season standings

Race podiums
 0 wins
 3 podiums – (2 DH, 1 SG); 11 top tens

World Championship results

Olympic results

See also
 Italy at the 2018 Winter Olympics

References

External links
 
 
 Nicol Delago at Italian Winter Sports Federation (FISI) 
 Nicol Delago at Atomic Skis

1996 births
Living people
Italian female alpine skiers
Alpine skiers of Fiamme Gialle
Alpine skiers at the 2018 Winter Olympics
Alpine skiers at the 2022 Winter Olympics
Olympic alpine skiers of Italy
Sportspeople from Brixen